Thomas James Roussel (born January 20, 1945) is a former American football linebacker in the National Football League for the Washington Redskins, the New Orleans Saints, and the Philadelphia Eagles.  He played college football at The University of Southern Mississippi and was drafted in the second round of the 1968 NFL Draft.

References 

1945 births
Living people
American football linebackers
Washington Redskins players
New Orleans Saints players
Philadelphia Eagles players
People from Thibodaux, Louisiana
Players of American football from Louisiana
Southern Miss Golden Eagles football players